Akhnaton is a music venue in Amsterdam, founded in 1953. The venue is also host to pop-up restaurants, and political conferences.

Notable events and associated acts 

 In May 2002, the first Wicked Jazz Sounds event was organized at Akhnaton.
 As of 2016, Burning Man Netherlands Foundation, the first Burning Man affiliate outside the United States, organizes activities and town hall meetings here.
 In January 2020, the venue hosted Bar 0.020, described in Dutch business news De Ondernemer as "the first alcohol-free pub in the Netherlands". The pop-up bar in support of the Dry January campaign, was hosted from January 3rd until February 1st.

References

External links 

 

Music venues in the Netherlands
1953 establishments in the Netherlands
Music in Amsterdam